Medak is a town in Medak district of the Indian state of Telangana. It is a municipality and the headquarters of Medak mandal in Medak revenue division. And There is a river named srujan which is big in length.

Etymology and History 
Medak was originally named Methukudurgam or Methuku Seema (translated to grain in Telugu) due to the growth of rice here.

Geography
It has an average elevation of 442 meters (1450 feet).

Climate

Demographics

 census of India, the town had a population of 44,255 with 9011 households. The total population constitute, 21,336 males and 22,919 females —a sex ratio of 1074 females per 1000 males. 4,815 children are in the age group of 0–6 years, of which 2,418 are boys and 2,397 are girls —a ratio of 991 per 1000. The average literacy rate stands at 78.56% with 30,984 literates, significantly higher than the state average of 66.46%.

Governance
Medak municipality was formed in the year 1953. Medak urban agglomeration consists of Medak municipality and the out growth of Ausulapalle village.

Economy
The largest employer in Medak is Ordnance Factory Medak of the Ordnance Factories Board. It manufactures products for the Indian Armed Forces and is the largest contributor to Medak's economy.

Tourism 
Pocharam Wildlife Sanctuary is a forest and wildlife sanctuary named for the nearby Pocharam Lake. Medak Cathedral sees over the Diocese of Medak, the single largest diocese in Asia. Medak Fort is a popular tourist attraction. The fort was originally constructed by the Kakatiya kings and later developed by the Qutb Shahi kings. Ancient temple of Kuchadri Venkateshwara Swamy at Kuchanpally is a nearby Hindu worship centre.

References

External links

 Medak municipality
 Medak local government page

Towns in Medak district
District headquarters of Telangana